Liliana Palihovici (born 26 November 1971) is a Moldovan politician.

She has been a member of the Parliament of Moldova from 2009 until 2017.

External links 
 Liliana PALIHOVICI
 https://web.archive.org/web/20110716212731/http://www.pldm.md/index.php?option=com_content&view=article&id=907&Itemid=4
 Site-ul Parlamentului Republicii Moldova
 Site-ul Partidului Liberal Democrat din Moldova

References

1971 births
Living people
Moldova State University alumni
21st-century Moldovan historians
Moldovan MPs 2014–2018
Liberal Democratic Party of Moldova MPs
Moldovan MPs 2009–2010
Moldovan female MPs
21st-century Moldovan women politicians
Women historians